The 1948 United States Senate election in Louisiana was held on November 2, 1948. Incumbent Senator Allen J. Ellender was re-elected to a third term in office.

On August 31, Ellender won the Democratic primary with 61.7% of the vote. At this time, Louisiana was a one-party state, and the Democratic nomination was tantamount to victory. Ellender won the November general election without an opponent.

Democratic primary

Candidates
James Domengeaux, U.S. Representative from Louisiana's 3rd congressional district
Allen J. Ellender, incumbent Senator
Charles S. Gerth, candidate for Senate in 1944

Results

General election

References

Single-candidate elections
1948
Louisiana
1948 Louisiana elections